Creugas is a genus of corinnid sac spiders first described by Tamerlan Thorell in 1878.

Species
 it contains twenty species in the Americas from Mexico to Brazil, and one (C. gulosus) with a cosmopolitan distribution:
Creugas annamae (Gertsch & Davis, 1940) – Mexico
Creugas apophysarius (Caporiacco, 1947) – Guyana
Creugas bajulus (Gertsch, 1942) – Mexico
Creugas bellator (L. Koch, 1866) – Venezuela, Colombia, Ecuador
Creugas berlandi Bonaldo, 2000 – Ecuador
Creugas bicuspis (F. O. Pickard-Cambridge, 1899) – Mexico
Creugas cinnamius Simon, 1888 – Mexico
Creugas comondensis Jiménez, 2007 – Mexico
Creugas epicureanus (Chamberlin, 1924) – Mexico
Creugas falculus (F. O. Pickard-Cambridge, 1899) – Mexico
Creugas guaycura Jiménez, 2008 – Mexico
Creugas gulosus Thorell, 1878 (type) – Southern America. Introduced to Africa, Myanmar, Australia, Pacific islands
Creugas lisei Bonaldo, 2000 – Brazil, Uruguay, Argentina
Creugas mucronatus (F. O. Pickard-Cambridge, 1899) – Costa Rica, Panama
Creugas navus (F. O. Pickard-Cambridge, 1899) – Mexico
Creugas nigricans (C. L. Koch, 1841) – Mexico, Colombia
Creugas plumatus (L. Koch, 1866) – Colombia
Creugas praeceps (F. O. Pickard-Cambridge, 1899) – Mexico
Creugas silvaticus (Chickering, 1937) – Panama
Creugas uncatus (F. O. Pickard-Cambridge, 1899) – Mexico

References

Araneomorphae genera
Corinnidae
Cosmopolitan spiders
Spiders of Central America
Spiders of Mexico
Spiders of South America
Taxa named by Tamerlan Thorell